Stop Mute Defeat is the tenth studio album by American band White Hills. It was released on May 19, 2017 through Thrill Jockey.

Accolades

Track listing

References

2017 albums
Thrill Jockey albums